Blaine Elwood Bishop III (born July 24, 1970) is a former professional American football safety in the National Football League who played most notably for the Tennessee Titans. He was drafted by the Houston Oilers in the 1993 NFL Draft.

Early life
Bishop attended and played at Cathedral High School in Indianapolis - class of 1988. He then attended St. Joseph's College and played football there before transferring to play college football at Ball State University in  Muncie, Indiana.  At Ball State University, Bishop earned All-Mid-American Conference Second-team choice in 1992 as a senior and 1990 as a sophomore.  Named team captain his senior year.  Bishop made 243 total tackles, 13 pass breakups, 15 tackles for loss, 12 sacks, one interception, and one blocked kick.

Professional career

Bishop was drafted in the eighth round (214th overall) of the 1993 NFL Draft by the Houston Oilers. Bishop went on to have a successful NFL career, earning Pro Bowl status four times in 1995, 1996, 1997, and 2000. He was also a three-time All-Pro selection, in 1995, 1996, and 2000. Bishop was widely recognized as the NFL's premier hitting safety during his tenure with the Oilers/Tennessee Titans. In 1999, the Titans made it to Super Bowl XXXIV in which Bishop started, however they lost to the Kurt Warner-led St. Louis Rams. In 2002, he replaced Damon Moore as the starting strong-side safety with the Philadelphia Eagles, forming a tandem with free safety Brian Dawkins.

Personal life
Shortly after retiring from his playing career, Bishop worked briefly at WTVF "NewsChannel 5" in Nashville, Tennessee providing sports commentary, usually as part of Titans post-game coverage. He currently co-hosts a radio show in Nashville called "Blaine and Mickey” with Mickey Ryan on WGFX "104.5 the Zone" from 1 pm to 3 pm central each weekday. He also coaches the defense at Davidson Academy, a Nashville-area private high school. On Tennessee Titans game days, Bishop can be heard as part of the Titans Radio pre-game and post-game broadcast team on WGFX "104.5 the Zone", affiliates of the Titans Radio Network, and at www.titansradio.com. He is represented by KMG Sports Management.  Bishop has also been an announcer for the Tennessee high school football state championship games along with former Titans teammate Kevin Dyson.

References

External links
 

1970 births
Living people
Players of American football from Indianapolis
African-American players of American football
American football safeties
Houston Oilers players
Tennessee Oilers players
Tennessee Titans players
Philadelphia Eagles players
American Conference Pro Bowl players
Ball State Cardinals football players
21st-century African-American sportspeople
20th-century African-American sportspeople
Ed Block Courage Award recipients